The Unforgiving is the fifth studio album by Dutch symphonic metal band Within Temptation, released by Roadrunner Records on 29 March 2011. It was a concept album as one part of a transmedia storytelling project, which accompanied the release of three short films and a series of six comic books. The album followed the band's pattern of incorporating new musical elements on each release, this time marking a major transition point for the band and featuring more pop and 80s influences. Lyrically, the band focused on telling a story with specific characters, also present in the films and comic books.

Three singles were released for promoting the album. "Faster", the leading single, was released on 21 January 2011. The second single was "Sinéad", released on 21 March. The third and final one, "Shot in the Dark" was released on 12 September. Each single accompanied a short film in order to visually describe the story being told. The group also commenced The Unforgiving Tour in Europe by the middle of 2011. The tour later passed over North America and Latin America for a total amount of 111 concerts.

The album received generally favorable reviews from music critics, and the composition, storytelling and musical changes were the most discussed points. Reviewers from Big Cheese and sputnikmusic were welcoming of the changes presented by the band and congratulated the transmedia effort, while Kerrang! and Q magazine had some regards with the topics. The album also achieved commercial success, entering top ten positions in countries such as the Netherlands, Belgium, Finland, Germany and Austria.

Concept

Early ideas, realisation and development 
The initial concept was to write the soundtrack to a film. The band decided to change direction given the inconsistencies and other issues which movies can undergo. As vocalist Sharon den Adel commented:
"What happened was that we wanted to write lyrics for a movie. We were searching for a good movie with a good story and everybody had different release dates. If something goes wrong, a movie can very easily be postponed for a year, and we couldn't take the chance to have to wait for that, otherwise we would have had to postpone our album as well. So we decided to take the matter in our own hands."
In searching for a new concept, they approached the writer of The Chronicles of Spellborn comics, who introduced the band to Steven O'Connell. However, upon his first meeting with the band, he failed to impress them with ideas involving zombies and fantasy, while they were hoping for a more mature approach rather than something unclear and superficial. Sharon explained that, in trying to describe to O'Connell what they were looking for, "We told him what kind of movies we liked, what kind of books we read, and he thought about it and he came up with a basic idea, like 2 or 3 lines. The story is about people who have done bad things. Not because they are bad, but because they made bad decisions."
Following the formation of the initial ideas, O'Connell completed the rest of the story with additional suggestions from the band. For example, Sinéad was initially a South American woman named Maya, but, as the music to "Sinéad" had already been completed, Sharon requested that the name and nationality be changed. While shooting the three short films and music videos, Mother Maiden ("Faster"), Sinéad and Triplets ("Shot in the Dark"), the band and director (Joeri Holsheimer) came up with several other ideas, among them which song would connect to which story. The band's decision to shoot three short films was mostly to avoid the restrictions imposed on music videos, as Sharon explained:
"...we wanted to put all the money into the movies. You have a budget and then you have to make choices and, to be honest, MTV and everything, it is not so big anymore. And when you make videos, they always say "you can't use blood, you can't use guns, you can't use..." and we wanted to use everything: blood, guns... everything!"

As part of transmedia project 
A comic book of the same name, released simultaneously, was written by Steven O'Connell (BloodRayne and Dark 48) and illustrated by Romano Molenaar (Witchblade, The Darkness and X-Men). Three related short films were released prior to the album, the first of which, "Mother Maiden", was released on 31 January 2011. The first issue of the comic books, Penance, Part One, was released on 18 March 2011, and digitally released by Diamond Digital at the New York Comic Con on 22 October. The second issue, Penance, Part Two was released on 13 May. The third issue, Penance, Part Three, was released on 31 August and the fourth issue, Penance, Part Four, on 2 November.

Background

Recording 
The band first announced that they intended to make a new album in October 2008, as they were finishing touring in support of The Heart of Everything. The album was originally planned to be recorded in 2009, but was further delayed by vocalist Sharon den Adel giving birth to her and guitarist Robert Westerholt's second child. In an interview with Metal Ways at Appelpop 2008, Westerholt stated that the new album was "probably going to be kind of a concept, but it's so early still that nothing is really sure yet. But we're trying to look in that direction."

The album was eventually recorded in the Summer and Autumn of 2010, with the band announcing via their website in November that the album would be entitled The Unforgiving, expected for release in March 2011. The band also announced that their planned tour dates, beginning in March 2011, had been postponed till Autumn due to den Adel's third pregnancy.

Previews and promotion 
A video for "Where Is the Edge" was released on 15 December 2010, along with footage from the upcoming film Me and Mr Jones on Natalee Island. The band also announced that the album would be released alongside a comic book series with the same name, forming a story surrounding the main protagonist, Sinéad.

On 4 December Sharon commented via their official website that they had recorded three upcoming promotional music videos within the course of a week. The band also revealed that, alongside the record and the comic book series, three short films were to be released prior to the album.

The first single, "Faster", had its worldwide radio première on 96.3 Rock Radio on 21 January 2011. This was followed by the release of its music video on 31 January, along with the first short film, Mother Maiden. The band also announced that each of the remaining films would also accompany a band performance. An album trailer, featuring a clip of the new song "In the Middle of the Night" was released on 17 January 2011.

On 3 February 2011, the first English review of the album was published by a freelance journalist online via last.fm and his blog. Still in February, members of Within Temptation were in Paris to promote their new album in France. A first French interview with Sharon Den Adel was published on Metal-Ways.com (in English).

Sinéad, the second short film, was released on 21 March. The accompanying music video was officially released on 10 June 2011 to promote the song's single of the same name, which was released on 15 July. The single differs from the others, as it includes four remixes of the track by four different dance producers. The band also went to Germany to promote the single on Television.

The band commenced The Unforgiving Tour on 10 August at the Sziget Festival, Hungary, playing a selection of songs from The Unforgiving as well as some of their more popular tracks. At the Huntenpop Festival, Netherlands, The Unforgiving was played in its entirety, as well as some older songs. Within Temptation went on to perform at several more summer festivals, such as M'era Luna and Heitere Open Air, before commencing a North American Tour and an indoor European tour in the winter.

On 22 September 2011, the band performed "Where Is the Edge" and "Lost" at the première of Me and Mr Jones on Natalee Island during the 31st Netherlands Film Festival, where the three The Unforgiving short-films were screened.

The final short film, Triplets, was released on 1 September 2011. Its accompanying music video "Shot In the Dark" was officially released on 4 October.

On 20 December, the band released their new music video, Fire and Ice.

To continue promoting the album, the band started a South American tour, visiting Brazil, Chile, Argentina, Peru and Ecuador. After that, the band went back to Europe to headline several of the biggest European summer festivals, such as Sonisphere, Masters of Rock, Rock Werchter, Summerbreeze and Gods of Metal.

Reception 

Reviews from critics have been mostly positive, with particular praise for den Adel's voice and the band's innovative capacity. Metal Marketing commented on its "change in pace," calling it a career "turning point," but adding that it is "one of the best albums... in a long time," giving it 9.5 out of 10. UK punk, rock and metal magazine, Big Cheese, were also very positive, giving it 5 out of 5 and remarking, "Every song is glorious and frontwoman Sharon den Adel truly is the star of this spectacular show."

Metal Hammer were less favourable, giving the album a lower score of 7 out of 10, noting that fans of their former Celtic sound and "metallic symphonic thunder" may be disappointed, although praising the band for being "exceptional songwriters" and their shift in style, creating "an apt thriller soundtrack without losing their trademark symphonic elements." Classic Rock also gave it 7 out of 10, calling it "grandstanding stuff, multi-layered, complex and rich" as well as "overblown." Allmusic gave it 3.5 out of 5, stating that it "doesn't come off bombastic or overwrought" and that the band lets "the songwriting rule supreme."

Kerrang! were more negative, giving it a "good" score of just 3 out of 5 and deeming it "pretty unsatisfying," while conceding it to be "flawless and expertly crafted." Q gave it just 1 out of 5, the album's lowest rating, labelling the band "the metal T'Pau."

The album currently holds a score of 63 at the aggregate review site Metacritic, indicating "generally favourable reviews."

The Unforgiving was voted fourth and ninth in Roadrunner Records' Album of the Year and Album of the Century polls respectively. Metal Storm's readers awarded the album third place on its best symphonic metal albums of 2011 list and seventh on the "biggest surprise" list. It was also awarded fifth place in Loudwire's list of The Top 10 Rock Albums of 2011. Merlin Alderslade, from Metal Hammer, placed the album at ninth position in his top ten albums of 2011.

Critics' lists

Accolades

Track listing 

Notes
Lyrics and music credits adapted from booklet liner notes.
The special edition DVD includes a poster of the album cover and features names of those who promoted the "Where is the Edge" video on their Facebook page.

Personnel 
Within Temptation
Sharon den Adel – vocals
Robert Westerholt – rhythm guitar
Ruud Jolie – lead guitar
Jeroen van Veen – bass
Martijn Spierenburg – keyboards

Additional musicians
Nicka Hellenberg – drums
Stefan Helleblad – additional guitars
Dawn Mastin – spoken words on tracks 1 and 6
Franck van der Heijden – choir and orchestral arrangements

Charts

Weekly charts

Year-end charts

Certifications

References 

Within Temptation albums
Roadrunner Records albums
2011 albums
Concept albums
Multimedia works